Nikolaos "Nikos" Liberopoulos (born on 4 August 1975) is a retired Greek former professional international footballer who played as a forward. He is famous for his aim-to-goal shot, his innate in-play instincts, and his technical attacking skills. Liberopoulos is a unique player in Greek domestic football, as he is equally adored by fans of both AEK Athens and Panathinaikos. He is the only player to be recorded in the top ten scorers of all time for both these teams. Indeed, after seven seasons at Panathinaikos Liberopoulos scored 103 goals. On 10 May 2012, he reached a milestone 100 goals for AEK Athens after a brace against Atromitos, making him the only player in history to score a hundred goals for both Athens clubs (NOTE: this contradicts the tabulated data below, which gives 101 goals for AEK Athens and 87 goals for Panathinaikos. The latter is also in disagreement with data on the Elite Football website: 92 goals at AEK Athens and 76 goals at Panathinaikos). On 8 September 2017, he became the Technical Director of AEK.

Club career

Early years
Liberopoulos started his career football career at the local Erani Filiatra, he then moved to Kalamata in 1994. After an impressive debut season in Greece's top division, AEK Athens and Olympiacos tried to sign him during the summer of 1996 yet Panathinaikos managed to snap him up.

Panathinaikos
In summer 1996, he signed for Panathinaikos. With them he reached the semi-final stage of the UEFA Champions League. Italian clubs, mainly Juventus and Hellas Verona showed interest in hiring him, but his loyalty to Panathinaikos kept him in Athens. In 2003, Liberopoulos clashed with Panathinaikos' board which eventually led to him leaving the club. While at Panathinaikos he would deliberately misplace passes to his colleague Marco Villa because he saw him as more of a threat than a team mate.

AEK Athens
Following his departure from Panathinaikos he was ready to join Sochaux, but he finally chose AEK Athens where he became a formidable offensive player and inspirational leader. He went to score several times against his former team but never celebrated earning the fans' applause and a standing ovation for his action. He helped AEK Athens scoring 79 times in his 195 appearances and earning a top scorer award during the 2006–07 season. His most important goals originated from two long range shots, one in a 1–0 win against Lille and another in a 4–0 with against Olympiacos. During June 2007, Liberopoulos was offered a lucrative contract with 1. FC Nürnberg worth 4 million euros, which he declined to remain with AEK Athens. Club president, Demis Nikolaidis had publicly announced his intent to retain Liberopoulos at all costs in an effort to bolster AEK Athens' chances at achieving dominance in the Greek Super League. On 7 July 2008, Liberopoulos was released by AEK. German team Eintracht Frankfurt announced his signing on 13 July 2008.

Eintracht Frankfurt
Liberopoulos signed a two-year deal and received the number 10 shirt. He made his Bundesliga debut for Eintracht Frankfurt, playing the full 90 minutes against Hertha BSC on 17 August 2008 at the Commerzbank-Arena in Frankfurt. Liberopoulos scored his first goal against Mainz 05. He won 55 caps scoring 13 goals in all competitions.

Return to AEK Athens
Liberopoulos again signed for AEK Athens in the summer of 2010 and put in an impressive display in AEK's 5–3 win against Australian A-League club Sydney FC on 25 July 2010, scoring one goal and setting up two others. Liberopoulos also scored against Blackburn three days later. He made his league debut against Kerkyra and scored his first official goal in a UEFA Europa League match against Hajduk Split. On 19 January 2010, in a Greek Cup match against Panathinaikos he scored two goals leading his team to victory. Liberopoulos was applauded during his substitution later in that game by some of Panathinaikos' fans despite their team's defeat. After the match Liberopoulos said "I have spent seven nice years in Panathinaikos in which I matured as a player. I keep only the positive things, but now for me AEK is my family and I will do everything for the team." and about the Panathinaikos' fans ovation "It means a lot to me. It's a great feeling to be applauded during your substitution. There were some hoots also but even if the whole stadium was hooting at me that would not have changed what I have said earlier about my feelings for Panathinaikos". On 30 May 2011, Liberopulos won his first trophy in his career with AEK winning the Greek Cup 2010–11 against Atromitos 3–0 while also scoring the first goal and was awarded MVP of the match.

On 16 June 2011, Liberopoulos signed a new one-year deal keeping him at the club until 2012. Also, his teammate Traianos Dellas decided to stay for one year at AEK, in order to stop his professional career with his best friend, Liberopoulos.

On 20 May 2012, he played his last match with AEK against Panathinaikos. A lot of Panathinaikos and AEK fans respected him with a standing ovation when he was exiting the stadium.

International career
Liberopoulos played for Greece U21 from 1996 to 1998, where in 23 he scored 15 becoming their top scorer. He was also a key member of the team that took part in the final of the European Championship in 1998, where they lost to  Spain.

In 1997 he was called to the military team, where he won the World Military Cup of the same year, scoring in the final against Italy.

Liberopoulos appeared 76 times in total for Greece scoring 13 goals in the process. His most notable performance in the Euro 2008 qualifiers to date was a last-second goal five minutes into stoppage time to grant Greece a 2–1 victory over Moldova on 6 June 2007, which placed Greece at the top of their qualifying division. Liberopoulos has been known on the international scene as a "super sub", coming off the bench many times in the final quarter of games and scoring the decisive goal.

He was a member of the 23-man squad formed by coach Otto Rehhagel for UEFA Euro 2008.

On 11 September 2009, Liberopoulos announced his retirement from international football, But he returned to the national squad about a year later when he was recalled by the new coach Fernando Santos.

He was also called for UEFA Euro 2012 by the coach Fernando Santos. Liberopoulos announced his retirement from international football after Greece lost to German 4–2 in the Euro 2012 quarter finals on 22 June 2012.

Career statistics

Club

International

Scores and results list Greece's goal tally first, score column indicates score after each Liberopoulos goal.

Honours

AEK Athens
Greek Cup: 2010–11

Greece U21
Euro U21: 1998 Runner-up

Individual
Greek Young Footballer of the year: 1995–96
Greek Footballer of the year: 1999–2000, 2005–06, 2006–07
Greek Super League top scorer: 2002–03, 2006–07

References

Living people
1975 births
People from Filiatra
Greek footballers
Association football forwards
Greece international footballers
Greece under-21 international footballers
UEFA Euro 2008 players
UEFA Euro 2012 players
Bundesliga players
Super League Greece players
Football League (Greece) players
AEK Athens F.C. players
Panathinaikos F.C. players
Kalamata F.C. players
Eintracht Frankfurt players
AEK F.C. non-playing staff
Greek expatriate footballers
Greek expatriate sportspeople in Germany
Expatriate footballers in Germany
Footballers from the Peloponnese